The following is a list of MTV Asia Awards winners for Favorite Pop Act.

MTV Asia Awards